Justice Bland may refer to:

Jane Bland (born 1965), associate justice of the Supreme Court of Texas
Hugh M. Bland (1898–1967), justice of the Arkansas Supreme Court

See also
Judge Bland (disambiguation)